Karen Jean Bandeen-Roche is an American biostatistician known for her research on aging and aging-related frailty. She is Hurley Dorrier Professor of Biostatistics and Chair of the Biostatistics Department at the Johns Hopkins Bloomberg School of Public Health.

Education and career
Bandeen-Roche studied mathematics at Andrews University, graduating in 1985. She earned a master's degree and PhD in operations research from Cornell University in 1988 and 1990 respectively. Her dissertation, supervised by David Ruppert, was A Receptor-Based Model for the Statistical Analysis of Air Pollution Data: Source Apportionment with One Source Unknown. She has worked at Johns Hopkins Bloomberg School of Public Health since 1990, and became Hurley Dorrier Professor and Chair in 2008.

Awards and honors
Bandeen-Roche has been a fellow of the American Statistical Association since 2001.

References

External links
Home page

Year of birth missing (living people)
Living people
American women statisticians
Andrews University alumni
Cornell University alumni
Johns Hopkins Bloomberg School of Public Health faculty
Fellows of the American Statistical Association
Johns Hopkins Bloomberg School of Public Health
21st-century American women